John Bastard (c. 1787 – 11 January 1835) of Sharpham, Ashprington, Devon, was an officer of the Royal Navy who saw service during the French Revolutionary and Napoleonic Wars, and the War of 1812, rising to the rank of post-captain. He also entered politics and became a Member of Parliament.

Bastard was born into a family with considerable political connections, and was a grandson of the distinguished Royal Navy officer Captain Philemon Pownoll (d.1780), the builder of Sharpham House. He entered the navy and rose through the ranks during the wars with France. He was promoted to commander and given his first ship while in the East Indies, and was able to show his qualities by chasing a larger French privateer until she was captured by a larger British ship. Promoted to post-captain soon afterwards, one of his first post commands was the former privateer he had helped to capture. He was moved to the North American station shortly before the outbreak of the War of 1812 and commanded the station's flagship while serving in a detached squadron. His ship was sent home in 1814 and he commanded only one other ship before the drawdown of the navy after the end of the wars. He then entered politics, sitting for Dartmouth until 1832.

Family
John Bastard was born c. 1787, the second son of Edmund Bastard, and his wife Jane Pownall. His father's side of the family included a large number of politicians, and a number of Tory Bastards sat in Parliament during the eighteenth and nineteenth centuries. Among them was his father, who represented Dartmouth, his uncle John Pollexfen Bastard, who represented Devonshire, and his brother Edmund Pollexfen Bastard, who represented Dartmouth and Devon. John would follow his family into politics, sitting for Dartmouth after his brother vacated his seat to sit for Devon. Through his mother John was the grandson of the distinguished naval officer Philemon Pownoll, whose estates at Sharpham, near at Ashprington, in Devon he eventually inherited.

Early career
Bastard entered the navy and after a number of years of service, was promoted to lieutenant on 6 April 1804. His promotion came from the First Lord of the Admiralty, Lord St Vincent, in honour of his grandfather's contribution. He was advanced to master and commander on 22 May 1806, and was given command of the 16-gun sloop  in the East Indies. Shortly after Bastard took command Rattlesnake came across the French privateer-frigate Bellone under Captain Jacques François Perroud off Ceylon, and despite the Frenchman's heavier armament, chased her north-west. By 3.15pm on 9 July they came in sight of the 74-gun , under Captain Robert Plampin, some seven miles off the coast. Bellone had the advantage of the wind, whereas Plampin struggled to bring his ship close enough to intercept. Perroud attempted to bring his ship between Powerful and the shore before Plampin could cut her off, but Plampin was able to manoeuvre within range by 5pm and a running battle broke out, until the French finally struck at 6.45pm. Bastard's next command was the brig-sloop  in January 1807, though she was sold in Bombay in April that year.

Post-captain
Bastard was promoted to post-captain on 12 October 1807 and was given command of the ship he had helped to capture. The Bellone had been brought into the Navy as the sixth rate , with Bastard becoming her first British commander. He remained with St Fiorenzo until she was paid off in 1808.

North America

Bastard then served in North America, where he was temporarily in command of the 74-gun  on the Halifax station. He took command of the 64-gun  in November 1811, the flagship of Vice-Admiral Herbert Sawyer. With the outbreak of the War of 1812 Africa was sent to join Captain Philip Broke's squadron in July 1812, and was present at the capture of the 14-gun  on 15 July. Instead they found the USS Nautilus, under William M. Crane, which failed to outrun the British squadron and surrendered, becoming the first warship either side lost during the war.

Bastard remained in command of Africa until she was sent back to Britain and broken up in May 1814. He was given command of the 38-gun  as a replacement ship and commanded her in British waters, fitting out at several dockyards.

Politics and later life
Bastard entered politics in 1816. His family had considerable influence in a number of Cornish constituencies, and when his uncle, John Pollexfen Bastard, died, Edmund Pollexfen Bastard, John's brother, took his place as representative for Devon. This created a vacancy in Edmund's constituency of Dartmouth, and John was elected to fill it on 16 May 1816. He held the seat until its partial disenfranchisement in the 1832 Reform Act. He was also an alderman for Dartmouth. He married Frances Wade on 7 October 1817. John Bastard died at Upper Grosvenor Street, London on 11 January 1835, at the age of 48.

Disambiguation
John Pollexfen Bastard—John Bastard RN and Edmund Pollexfen Bastard—Edmund Bastard

Notes

a.  There was already a ship of this name in the navy, an elderly 74-gun third rate. In consequence of this the new Bellona was renamed HMS Blanche in February 1808. Coincidentally Bastard would command the older Bellona in 1811, during his time on the North American station.

Citations

References

 John Burke, Bastard of Kitley, A Genealogical and Heraldic History of the Commoners of Great Britain and Ireland Henry Colburn London 1834.

External links 
 

1780s births
1835 deaths
Royal Navy officers
Royal Navy personnel of the French Revolutionary Wars
Royal Navy personnel of the Napoleonic Wars
Royal Navy personnel of the War of 1812
Members of the Parliament of the United Kingdom for Dartmouth
UK MPs 1812–1818
UK MPs 1818–1820
UK MPs 1820–1826
UK MPs 1826–1830
UK MPs 1830–1831
UK MPs 1831–1832